Joker is a 1993 Indian Telugu-language comedy film produced by P. Pattabhi Rama Rao and M. Lakshman Kumar Chowdary under the Padma Priya Arts banner and directed by Vamsy. It stars Rajendra Prasad, Vani Viswanath, Baby Shamili  and music also composed by Vamsy. The film is a remake of the Malayalam movie Kilukkampetti (1991), which was later remade as Hindi movie Pyaar Impossible! (2010). The film was recorded as a hit at the box office.

Plot
Balaji is a highly talented architect at PADGRO Company, Hyderabad branch. He is a big womanizer, his company is constructing a huge prestigious project at Tirupati branch, which is why he has been relocated to Tirupati. He was supposed to replace his junior named Usha Rani. Usha Rani is a very stubborn woman who hates men. She was not happy about the company's decision: She does not want to move out of Tirupati because of her eight-year-old kid Apple, who is the daughter of her sister, the child's father killed his wife and also tried to kill the child.

Balaji comes to Tirupati, sees Usha Rani in a hotel and truly falls in love with her. After that, he leaves all his bad habits and gets each and every bit of information regarding Usha Rani through his assistant Subba Raju and he is even ready to accept Usha Rani, knowing that she has a child. Apple is a very naughty girl, Usha Rani is not able to get a caretaker as no one is able to handle her. Balaji reaches Usha Rani's house as a caretaker under the name of Joker with the intention of getting her to love him. After entering the job, Balaji develops very much affection towards Apple. What follows are funny situations in which Balaji has to take care of the girl, cook for the family and kids, and hide himself from those at his office.

Eventually, Usha Rani goes to Balaji's house to request him not to take charge in Tirupati and, on seeing him, understands that he had tricked her. But Balaji resigns from his job and appears to have gone back to Hyderabad. Usha Rani starts to understand his love and feels sad. But on reaching her home, she finds that Balaji is back again as Joker. Thus the movie ends on a happy note.

Cast
Rajendra Prasad as Balaji / Joker
Vani Viswanath as Usha Rani
Jaggayya as Manager B. S. Murthy
Rallapalli as Manager Lakshmi Narayana
Mallikarjuna Rao as Subbaraju
Sivaji Raja as K. C. Reddy
Sakshi Ranga Rao as David
Kallu Chidambaram
Jayalalita as Vijayalakshmi
Abhilasha as Luisa 
Rekha as Kantham
Baby Shamili as Apple

Soundtrack

Music was composed by Vamsy. Lyrics were written by Gurucharan. The lyrics of the song Repanti Rupam Kanti from Manchi Chedu (1953) by Acharya Aatreya were largely used in this movie. Music released on AKASH Music Company.

References

External links

1993 comedy-drama films
1993 films
Indian comedy-drama films
Films directed by Vamsy
Telugu remakes of Malayalam films
1990s Telugu-language films